The Dilys Award was presented every year from 1992 to 2014 by the Independent Mystery Booksellers Association. It was given to the mystery title of the year which the member booksellers have most enjoyed selling.  The Independent Mystery Booksellers Association is an association of retail businesses that are either wholly or substantially devoted to the sale of mystery books. The Dilys award is named after Dilys Winn, who founded the first specialty bookseller of mystery books in the United States.

Awards 
Winners and nominated titles for each year:

Notes

External links 
 

Mystery and detective fiction awards
American literary awards
 
 
Awards established in 1992
Awards disestablished in 2014